Francis Albert Foley (1903-date of death unknown) was an English athlete.

Athletics
He competed in the Long jump, pole vault, shot put and 120 yards hurdles at the 1930 British Empire Games for England.

Personal life
He was a sergeant in the Scots Guards.

References

1903 births
Year of death missing
English male long jumpers
English male pole vaulters
English male shot putters
English male hurdlers
Athletes (track and field) at the 1930 British Empire Games
Commonwealth Games competitors for England